Strømsheim is a Norwegian surname. Notable people with the surname include:

 Anne Margrethe Strømsheim (1914–2008), Norwegian resistance member
 Birger Strømsheim (1911–2012), Norwegian resistance member
 , biathloner

Norwegian-language surnames